The Koli is an Indian caste found in Rajasthan, Himachal Pradesh, Gujarat, Maharashtra, Uttar Pradesh, Haryana, Karnataka, Odisha and Jammu and Kashmir states in India. Koli is an agriculturist caste of Gujarat but in coastal areas they also work as fishermen along with agriculture. In the beginning of 20th century, the Koli caste was recognised as a Criminal Tribe under Criminal Tribes Act by British Indian government because of their anti-social activities during World War I.

The Koli caste forms the largest caste-cluster in Gujarat and Himachal Pradesh, comprising 24%  and 30% of the total population in those states respectively.

History

Early 

There has historically been some difficulty in identifying people as Koli or as Bhil people in what is now the state of Gujarat. The two communities co-existed in the hills of that area and even today there is confusion regarding their identity, not helped, in the opinion of sociologist Arvind Shah, by there being "hardly any modern, systematic, anthropological, sociological or historical study" of the Kolis. Sources from the medieval period suggest that the term koli was applied generically to lawless people, whilst British colonial studies considered it to be a vague collective noun for varied communities whose sole common feature was that they were inferior to the Kunbis. At some stage, koli became accepted as a caste and thus superior to the tribal Bhils.

Records of Koli people exist from at least the 15th century, when rulers in the present-day Gujarat region called their chieftains marauding robbers, dacoits, and pirates. Over a period of several centuries, some of them were able to establish petty chiefdoms throughout the region, mostly comprising just a single village. Although not Rajputs, this relatively small subset of the Kolis claimed the status of the higher-ranked Rajput community, adopting their customs and intermixing with less significant Rajput families through the practice of hypergamous marriage, which was commonly used to enhance or secure social status. There were significant differences in status throughout the Koli community, however, and little cohesion either geographically or in terms of communal norms, such as the establishment of endogamous marriage groups.

Through the colonial British Raj period and into the 20th century, some Kolis remained significant landholders and tenants, although most had never been more than minor landowners and labourers. By this time, however, most Kolis had lost their once-equal standing with the Patidar community due to the land reforms of the Raj period. The Kolis preferred the landlord-based tenure system, which was not so mutually beneficial. They were subject to interference from the British revenue collectors, who intervened to ensure that the stipulated revenue was remitted to the government before any surplus went to the landlord. Being less inclined to take an active role in agriculture personally and thus maximise revenues from their landholdings, the Koli possessions were often left uncultivated or underused. These lands were gradually taken over by Kanbi cultivators, while the Kolis became classified as a criminal tribe due to their failure to meet the revenue demands and their tendency to raid Kanbi villages to survive. The Kanbi land takeovers also reduced the Kolis to being the tenants and agricultural labourers of Kanbis rather than landowners, thus increasing the economic inequality between the communities. The difference was further exacerbated by the Kanbis' providing better tenancy arrangements for members of their own community than for Kolis.

Twentieth century 
During the later period of the Raj, the Gujarati Kolis became involved in the process of what has subsequently been termed sanskritisation. At that time, in the 1930s, they represented around 20 percent of the region's population and members of the local Rajput community were seeking to extend their own influence by co-opting other significant groups as claimants to the ritual title of Kshatriya. The Rajputs were politically, economically and socially marginalised because their own numbers — around 4 - 5 per cent of the population — were inferior to the dominant Patidars, with whom the Kolis were also disenchanted. The Kolis were among those whom the Rajputs targeted because, although classified as a criminal tribe by the British administration, they were among the many communities of that period who had made genealogical claims of descent from the Kshatriya. The Rajput leaders preferred to view the Kolis as being Kshatriya by dint of military ethos rather than origin but, in whatever terminology, it was a marriage of political expedience.

In 1947, around the time that India gained independence, the Kutch, Kathiawar, Gujarat Kshatriya Sabha (KKGKS) caste association emerged as an umbrella organisation to continue the work begun during the Raj. Christophe Jaffrelot, a French political scientist, says that this body, which claimed to represent the Rajputs and Kolis, "... is a good example of the way castes, with very different ritual status, join hands to defend their common interests. ... The use of the word Kshatriya was largely tactical and the original caste identity was seriously diluted."

The relevance of the Kshatriya label in terms of ritual was diminished by the practical actions of the KKGKS which, among other things, saw demands for the constituent communities to be classified as Backward Classes in the Indian scheme for positive discrimination. Kshatriyas would not usually wish to be associated with such a category and indeed it runs counter to the theory of Sanskritisation, but in this instance, it suited the socio-economic and political desires. By the 1950s, the KKGKS had established schools, loan systems and other mechanisms of communal self-help and it was demanding reforms to laws relating to land. It was also seeking alliances with political parties at the state level; initially, with the Indian National Congress and then, by the early 1960s, with the Swatantra Party. By 1967, the KKGKS was once again working with Congress because, despite being a haven for Patidars, the party leadership needed the votes of the KKGKS membership. The Kolis gained more from the actions of the KKGKS in these two decades than did the Rajputs, and Jaffrelot believes that it was around this time that a Koli intelligentsia emerged. Ghanshyam Shah, a professor at Jawaharlal Nehru University, describes the organisation today as covering a broad group of communities, from disadvantaged Rajputs of high prestige to the semi-tribal Bhils, with the Kolis in the middle. He notes that its composition reflects "a common economic interest and a growing secular identity born partly out of folklore but more out of common resentment against the well-to-do castes".

The Kolis of Gujarat remained educationally and occupationally disadvantaged compared to communities such as the Brahmins and Patidars. Their many Jātis include the Bareeya, Khant and Thakor, and they also use Koli as a suffix, giving rise to groups such as the Gulam Koli and Matia Koli. Some do not refer to themselves as Koli at all.

Classification 
The Koli community classified as Other Backward Class by Government of India in the Indian States of Gujarat, Karnataka, Maharashtra and Uttar Pradesh. but in Maharashtra, Tokre Koli, Malhar Koli and Mahadev Kolis are listed as Scheduled Tribe by State Government of Maharashtra.

The Government of India classified the Koli community as Scheduled Caste in the 2001 census for the states of Delhi, Madhya Pradesh and Rajasthan.

Criminal Tribes Act 
The Koli caste of Maharashtra and Gujarat was classified as a Criminal Tribe under Criminal Tribes Act of 1871 by British Indian Government or Bombay government because of their anti-social activities such as robberies, murder, blackmailing, and crop and animal theft. In 1914, Kolis of Maharashtra revolted against British rule and attacked the British officials and to control the kolis, British government again declared the Kolis as a criminal Tribe under Bombay criminal Tribes Act. Around 7000 kolis were required to attend the call each day. Kolis often attacked the Marwari Banias, Sahukars and Moneylenders. if Kolis were not able to pay the debt given by Moneylenders so they always burnt the house and account books and looted the available valuables. It was much common for Kolis of Maharashtra and Gujarat so kolis were notorious tribe for British officials. in 1925, kolis were registered under Criminal Tribes Act. The indian historian G. S. Ghurye writes that Kolis worked as soldiers in British Indian Army in several Regiments but again in 1940 Koli soldiers were classified as a Criminal Tribe under Criminal Tribe Act by British Bombay Government for their uncommon activities against Britishers.

Rebellion

Notable people

Notes

References

Bibliography

Further reading

External links 

 Plants and animals important to the Koli-Agri community in Maharashtra on Biodiversity of India
 A community called Koli – The Indian Express

 
Scheduled Castes of Rajasthan
Social groups of Uttar Pradesh
Hindu ethnic groups
Social groups of Gujarat
Fishing communities in India
Social groups of Maharashtra
Scheduled Castes of Delhi
Scheduled Tribes of India
Denotified tribes of India
Scheduled Castes of Madhya Pradesh
Shudra castes
Scheduled Tribes of Odisha